Soldiers and Sailors Monument is a war monument located in Lafayette Square, Buffalo, New York.  It was the work of sculptor Casper Buberl and architect George Keller.  It was unveiled in 1882.

The monument's shaft supports a  female figure, and four  bronze statues, representing the infantry, artillery, cavalry and navy, sculpted by Caspar Buberl, which face the four cardinal points.  Bronze bas-reliefs encircle the column above the statues.   The female figure is a "nameless stone lady, "emblematic of Buffalo."

The dedication on the west (Main Street) side honors those who laid down their lives "in the war to maintain the union for the cause of their country and of mankind." Half of Abraham Lincoln's Gettysburg Address graces the east side of the monument. Several bas-relief panels feature scenes of Lincoln's original cabinet: Treasury Secretary Salmon Chase, Secretary of State William H. Seward, Attorney General Edward Bates, Postmaster General Montgomery Blair, Secretary of the Interior, Caleb Smith, Secretary of the Navy Gideon Welles, Major General Winfield Scott, and Secretary of War Simon Cameron.

Gallery

References

1882 sculptures
Buildings and structures completed in 1882
Buildings and structures in Erie County, New York
Union (American Civil War) monuments and memorials in New York (state)